Alan Ralph Osmond (born June 22, 1949) is an American former singer and musician. He is best known for being a member of the family musical group The Osmonds, who were discovered in 1961 by Jay Emerson Williams, Andy Williams's father, at a performance at Disneyland which was being filmed for the Disneyland After Dark episode of Walt Disney's Wonderful World of Color. At the time, Alan (age 12) and his brothers were performing as the Osmond Brothers Boys' Quartet.

Life and career 

Osmond was born in Ogden, Utah, the son of Olive May (née Davis; 1925–2004) and George Virl Osmond (1917–2007). He was the oldest of the seven siblings who could sing, as the two oldest brothers, Virl and Tom, are hearing impaired. During much of the Osmonds' career, Alan, being the oldest of the group, was the band's behind-the-scenes leader, playing piano and guitar, co-writing many of their songs, co-producing most of their recordings and arranging the dance choreography (he nevertheless seldom sang anything more than backing vocals, in contrast to his younger brothers). He mostly stopped performing with the group after 2007, and what he has professed to be his final performance with them was October 13, 2018, at Neal Blaisdell Arena in Honolulu.

Four of the Osmonds (Alan, Wayne, Merrill and Jay) were cast over a seven-year period on NBC's The Andy Williams Show. They also appeared in nine episodes of the 1963–1964 ABC western television series, The Travels of Jaimie McPheeters, with Alan in the role of young Micah Kissel. The series starred then 12-year-old Kurt Russell on a wagon train headed to the American West.

Personal life 
After a brief courtship with singer Karen Carpenter, Osmond married Suzanne Pinegar on July 16, 1974.  He and Suzanne have eight sons, who perform as the Osmond Brothers Second Generation: Michael Alan (born 1975); Nathan George (born 1977); Douglas Kenneth (born 1978); David Levi (born 1979); Scott Merrill (born 1981); Jonathon Pinegar (born 1983); Alexander Thomas (born 1988); and Tyler James (born 1990).  Alan, like all the Osmonds, is a member of the Church of Jesus Christ of Latter-day Saints; seven of his sons have served LDS missions, while the youngest son Tyler did not serve.

In 1980, Alan Osmond, along with his brother Merrill Osmond, created Stadium of Fire, which has become one of the largest Independence Day celebrations in the United States.

In 1987, Osmond was diagnosed with multiple sclerosis, a demyelinating disease which affects the nerve cells in the brain and spinal cord.  His son, David Osmond, lead singer of the group Osmonds 2nd Generation, who was also diagnosed with multiple sclerosis in 2005, participated in the eighth season of American Idol on January 28, 2009, with a pass to Hollywood. However, due to laryngitis, he was not able to make it past Hollywood week. David also substitutes for his uncle Donny in stage shows with his aunt Marie, and his song "We Are One" was used as the theme song to the Glenn Beck Radio Program from 2016 to 2017; he also hosted a brief revival of Wonderama in 2017.

In 2000, Alan Osmond received the Dorothy Corwin Spirit of Life Award from the National Multiple Sclerosis Society. In his acceptance speech, he stated that he had done some time in the military reserve and that he had taken karate lessons from Chuck Norris, both of which reinforced the "you can do it" attitude that he learned from his father. His motto is, "I may have MS, but MS does NOT have me!"  He currently runs the OneHeart Foundation which Alan and his wife founded, also works as a motivational speaker.

In November 2021, Alan and Suzanne Osmond were honored as Pillars of Utah Valley.

Military service 
Alan enlisted in the California Army National Guard in the late 1960s. He served at Fort Ord in northern California as a 144th artillery unit clerk.

Discography

Studio albums  

 Osmonds (1970)
 Homemade (1971)
 Phase III (1972)
 Crazy Horses (1972)
 The Plan (1973)
 Love Me for a Reason (1974)
 The Proud One (1975)
 Brainstorm (1976)
 Osmond Christmas Album (1976)
 Steppin' Out (1979)

References 

1949 births
Living people
American Latter Day Saints
American male guitarists
American male pop singers
American male saxophonists
American male trumpeters
American rock guitarists
American rock keyboardists
American rock saxophonists
American rock singers
American multi-instrumentalists
Songwriters from California
Rhythm guitarists
Musicians from Ogden, Utah
Singers from Los Angeles
People with multiple sclerosis
California National Guard personnel
The Osmonds members
Osmond family (show business)
Guitarists from Los Angeles
Guitarists from Utah
20th-century American guitarists
21st-century American saxophonists
21st-century trumpeters
20th-century American male musicians
21st-century American male musicians